Cyrtodactylus vilaphongi is a species of gecko, a lizard in the family Gekkonidae. It is endemic to Laos.

Etymology
The specific name, vilaphongi, is in honor of Laotian conservationist Vilaphong Kanyasone, who was one of the collectors of the holotype.

Geographic range
C. vilaphongi is found in northern Laos, in Luang Prabang Province.

Habitat

Description

Reproduction
The mode of reproduction of C. vilaphongi is unknown.

References

Further reading
Schneider N, Nguyen TQ, Le MD, Nophaseud L, Bonkowski M, Ziegler T (2014). "A new species of Cyrtodactylus (Squamata: Gekkonidae) from the karst forest of northern Laos". Zootaxa 3835 (1): 80–96. (Cyrtodactylus vilaphongi, new species).

Cyrtodactylus
Reptiles described in 2014